Mutinus ravenelii, or Ravenel's red stinkhorn, is a species of fungus that is often confused with M. elegans and M. caninus. M. ravenelii is a member of the Phallaceae (stinkhorn) family.

Edibility

The 'eggs' of Mutinus ravenelii are edible while the adult fungus itself is not yet known to be edible.

References

External links

Phallales
Fungi described in 1853